Sambo competitions at the 2019 European Games were held on 22 and 23 June 2019 at the Minsk Sports Palace.

Qualification
Qualification was based on the ranking list prepared by European Sambo Federation.

Medal summary

Medal table

Men's events

Women's events

References

 
Sports at the 2019 European Games
2019
European Games